Traveller Supplement 10: The Solomani Rim is a 1982 role-playing game supplement for Traveller published by Game Designers' Workshop.

Contents
The Solomani Rim is a star sector supplement on the region of space around Terra.

Reception
William A. Barton reviewed The Solomani Rim in The Space Gamer No. 56. Barton commented that "Overall, The Solomani Rim should definitely appeal to any Traveller player or ref who has longed to adventure in the area of Terra or who simply wants to know as much about the universe as possible."

Andy Slack reviewed Traveller Supplement 10: The Solomani Rim for White Dwarf #41, giving it an overall rating of 9 out of 10 for the novice and 2 for the expert, and stated that "I must say, I don't feel it has broken any new ground; and as GDW have said themselves, there are already enough subsector maps around."

Reviews
 Different Worlds #28 (April, 1983)
 Dragon #75 (July, 1983)

See also

References

Role-playing game supplements introduced in 1982
Traveller (role-playing game) supplements